This list of pterosaurs is a comprehensive listing of all genera that have ever been included in the order Pterosauria, excluding purely vernacular terms. The list includes all commonly accepted genera, but also genera that are now considered invalid, doubtful (nomen dubium), or were not formally published (nomen nudum), as well as junior synonyms of more established names, and genera that are no longer considered pterosaurian. The list currently includes 263 genera.

Scope and terminology 
There is no official, canonical list of pterosaur genera, but the most thorough attempts can be found at the Pterosauria section of Mikko Haaramo's Phylogeny Archive, the Genus Index at Mike Hanson's The Pterosauria, supplemented by the Pterosaur Species List, and in the fourth supplement of Donald F. Glut's Dinosaurs: The Encyclopedia series.

Authors and year 
The authors column lists the authors of the formal description responsible for the erection of the genus listed. They are not necessarily the same as the authors of the type species as sometimes a species from one genus is determined sufficiently distinct to warrant the erection of a new genus to house it. If this is the case, only the latter authors will be listed. The year column notes the year the description was published.

Status 
Naming conventions and terminology follow the International Code of Zoological Nomenclature. Technical terms used include:
 Junior synonym: A name which describes the same taxon as a previously published name. If two or more genera are formally designated and the type specimens are later assigned to the same genus, the first to be published (in chronological order) is the senior synonym, and all other instances are junior synonyms. Senior synonyms are generally used, except by special decision of the ICZN, but junior synonyms cannot be used again, even if deprecated. Junior synonymy is often subjective, unless the genera described were both based on the same type specimen.
 Nomen nudum (Latin for "naked name"): A name that has appeared in print but has not yet been formally published by the standards of the ICZN. Nomina nuda (the plural form) are invalid, and are therefore not italicized as a proper generic name would be. If the name is later formally published, that name is no longer a nomen nudum and will be italicized on this list. Often, the formally published name will differ from any nomina nuda that describe the same specimen.
 Preoccupied name: A name that is formally published, but which has already been used for another taxon. This second use is invalid (as are all subsequent uses) and the name must be replaced. As preoccupied names are not valid generic names, they will also go unitalicized on this list.
 Nomen dubium (Latin for "dubious name"): A name describing a fossil with no unique diagnostic features. As this can be an extremely subjective and controversial designation, this term is not used on this list.

Age 
The age column denotes the epoch of geologic time to which the fossils date. Genera that are invalid, misidentified, or otherwise do not represent a valid pterosaur are listed as age N/A because there was never a time in which a pterosaur by that generic name actually lived.

Location and notes 
The location column designates the geographic region where remains of the relevant genus have been found. The regions used are continents except in the case of smaller landmasses (e.g. Cuba.) Political bodies, being non-existent in the Mesozoic are not used to indicate genera locations. Genera that are invalid, misidentified, or otherwise do not represent a valid pterosaur are listed as location N/A because there was never a place in which a pterosaur by that generic name actually lived. The notes column is a collection of annotations on the scientific significance and taxonomic history of listed genera, as well as elaborations on the information presented in other columns.

The list

Genera 
{| border="0" style="background:transparent;" style="width: 100%"
|-
!width="90%"|
!width="5%"|
!width="5%"|
|-
|style="border:0px" valign="top"|
{| class="wikitable sortable" style="width: 100%; font-size: 95%"
|-
! Genus
! Authors
! Year
! Status
! Age
! Location
! class="unsortable" width="40%"| Notes
|-
|Aerodactylus
|Vidovic
Martill
|2014
|Valid
|
|Europe
|
|-
|Aerodraco
|Holgado
Pêgas
|2020
|Valid
|
|Europe
|
|-
|Aerotitan
|Novas
et al.
|2012
|Valid
|
|S. America
|
|-
|
Aetodactylus
|
Myers
|
2010
| Valid
|

|
N. America
|
|-
|Afrotapejara
|
Martill et al
|
2020
| Valid
|

|
Africa
|
|-
|
Aidachar
|
Nesov
|
1981
| Misidentification
|
N/A
|
N/A
|
Actually a teleost fish whose remains were originally mistaken for jaw fragments of a ctenochasmatid. The mistake was corrected in 1986.
|-
|Alamodactylus
|Andres
Myers
|2013
|Valid
|
|N. America
|
|-
|
Alanqa
|
Ibrahimet al.
|
2010
| Valid
|

|
Africa
|
|-
|Albadraco
|Solomon et al.
|2019
|Valid
|
|Europe
|
|-
|
Alcione
|
Longrich et al.
|
2018
| Valid
|

|
Africa
|
|-
|Allkaruen
|Codorniú et al.
|2016
|Valid
| or 
|S. America
|
|-
|Altmuehlopterus<ref>{{cite book |author1=Steven U. Vidovic |author2=David M. Martill |year=2017 |chapter=The taxonomy and phylogeny of Diopecephalus kochi (Wagner, 1837) and '‘Germanodactylus rhamphastinus (Wagner, 1851) |editor1=D. W. E. Hone |editor2=M. P. Witton |editor3=D. M. Martill |title=New Perspectives on Pterosaur Palaeobiology |journal=Geological Society of London, Special Publications |publisher=The Geological Society of London |volume= 455|issue=1 |pages= 125–147|doi=10.1144/SP455.12 |bibcode=2018GSLSP.455..125V |s2cid=219204038 |chapter-url=https://eprints.soton.ac.uk/423063/1/Vidovic_Martill_2017_Taxonomy_of_Diopecephalus_and_Germanodactylus_AM_with_Figures.pdf |url=https://eprints.soton.ac.uk/423063/1/Vidovic_Martill_2017_Taxonomy_of_Diopecephalus_and_Germanodactylus_AM_with_Figures.pdf }}</ref>
|Vidovic
Martill
|2017
|Valid
|
|Europe
|
|-
|Amblydectes|
Hooley
|
1914
|Nomen dubium
|

|
Europe
|
|-
|Angustinaripterus|
He
Xinluet al.|
1983
| Valid
|

|
Asia
|
Known from a single skull recovered from the Shaximiao Formation. Its Dorygnathus-like teeth suggest it had a piscivorous diet.
|-
|Anhanguera|
Campos
Kellner
|
1985
| Valid
|

|
S. America
|
A piscivorous anhanguerid from the Santana Formation. A study of its anatomy helped resolve controversy regarding pterodacyloids' posture while on the ground.
|-
|Anurognathus|
Döderlein
|
1923
| Valid
|
.
|
Europe
|
A tiny (50 cm wingspan) insectivore known only from two skeletons recovered from the Solnhofen Formation.
|-
|Apatomerus|
Williston
|
1903
|
Misidentification
|

|
N. America
|
Probably a misidentified plesiosaur.
|-
|Apatorhamphus|
McPhee et al.|2020
|Valid
|

|
Africa
|
|-
|Arambourgiania|
Nesov
Kanznyshkina
Cherepanov
|
1987
| Valid
|

|
Asia
|
|-
|Aralazhdarcho|
Averianov
|
2007
| Valid
|

|
Asia
|
|-
|Araripedactylus|
Wellnhofer
|
1977
| Valid
|

|
S. America
|
|-
|Araripesaurus|
Price
|
1971
| Valid
|

|
S. America
|
|-
|Archaeoistiodactylus|
Lü
Fucha
|
2011
| Valid
|

|
Asia
|
|-
|Arcticodactylus|Kellner
|2015
|Valid
|
|Europe
|
|-
|Ardeadactylus|Bennett
|2013
|Valid
|
|Europe
|
|-
|Argentinadraco|
Kellner & Calvo
|
2017
| Valid
|

|
S. America
|
|-
|Arthurdactylus|
Frey
Martill
|
1994
| Valid
|

|
S. America
|
|-
|Aurorazhdarcho|
Frey
Meyer
Tischlinger
|
2011
| Valid
|
.
|
Europe
|
|-
|Aussiedraco|
Kellner
Rodrigues
Costa
|
2011
| Valid
|

|
Australia
|
|-
|Austriadactylus|
Dalla Vecchia
Wild
Reitner
|
2002
| Valid
|

|
Europe
|
|-
|Austriadraco|Kellner
|2015
|Valid
|
|Europe
|
|-
|Avgodectes|
Peters
|
2004
|
Jr. synonym
|
N/A
|
N/A
|
Probable junior synonym of Haopterus.
|-
|Aymberedactylus|Pêgas et al.|2016
|Valid
|
|S. America
|
|-
|Azhdarcho|
Nesov
|
1984
| Valid
|

|
Asia
|
|-
|Bakonydraco|
Ösi
Weishampel
Jianu
|
2005
|
Valid
|

|
Europe
|
|-
|Balaenognathus|
Martillet al.|
2023
|
Valid
|

|
Europe
|
|-
|Banguela|Headden
Campos
|2015
|Jr. synonym
|
|S. America
|Subjective junior synonym of Thalassodromeus.
|-
|Barbaridactylus|
Longrich et al.|
2018
| Valid
|

|
Africa
|
|-
|Barbosania|
Elgin
Frey
|
2011
|
Valid
|

|
S. America
|
|-
|Batrachognathus|
Rjabinin
|
1948
| Valid
|
.
|
Asia
|
|-
|Beipiaopterus|
Lü
|
2003
| Valid
|

|
Asia
|
|-
|Belonochasma|
Broili
|
1939
|
Misidentification
|
N/A
|
N/A
|
A non-pterosaurian gnathostome.
|-
|Bellubrunnus|Honeet al.|2012
|Valid
|
|Europe
|
|-
|Bennettazhia|
Nesov
|
1991
|
Valid
|

|
N. America
|
|-
|Bergamodactylus|Kellner
|2015
|Valid
|
|Europe
|
|-
|Bogolubovia|
Nesov
A. A. Yarkov
|
1989
|
Valid
|

|
Asia
|
|-
|Boreopterus|
Lü
Q. Ji
|
2005
| Valid
|

|
Asia
|
|-
|Brachytrachelus|
Giebel
|
1852
|
Preoccupied
|
N/A
|
N/A
|
preoccupied name; now known as Scaphognathus|-
|Brasileodactylus|
Kellner
|
1984
|
Valid
|

|
S. America
|
|-
|Cacibupteryx|
Gasparini
Fernández
de la Fuente
|
2004
| Valid
|

|
Cuba
|
|-
|Caelestiventus|
Britt
Dalla Vecchia
Chure et al.
|
2018
| Valid
|

|
North America
|
|-
|Caiuajara|Manziget al.|2014
|Valid
|
|S. America
|
|-
|Camposipterus|Rodrigues
Kellner
|2013
|Valid
|
|Europe
|
|-
|
"Campylognathus"
|
Plieninger
|
1894
|
Preoccupied
|
N/A
|
N/A
|
preoccupied name; now known as Campylognathoides|-
|Campylognathoides|
Strand
|
1928
| Valid
|

|
Europe
|
|-
|Carniadactylus|
Dalla Vecchia
|
2009
|
Valid
|

|
Europe
|
Formerly Eudimorphodon rosenfeldi.
|-
|Cascocauda|Yang et al.
|2022
|Valid
|Middle Jurassic-Late Jurassic
|Asia
|
|-
|Cathayopterus|
Wang
Zhou
|
2006
|
Valid
|

|
Asia
|
|-
|Caulkicephalus|
Steel
Martillet al.|
2005
|
Valid
|

|
Europe
|
|-
|Caupedactylus|Kellner
|2013
|Valid
|
|S. America
|
|-
|Caviramus|
Fröbisch
Fröbisch
|
2006
| Valid
|

|
Europe
|
|-
|Cearadactylus|
Leonardi
Borgomanero
|
1985
|
Valid
|

|
S. America
|
|-
|Changchengopterus|
Lü
|
2009
| Valid
|

|
Asia
|
|-
|Chaoyangopterus|
Wang
Zhou
|
2003
| Valid
|

|
Asia
|
|-
|Cimoliopterus|Rodrigues
Kellner
|2013
|Valid
|
|Europe
|
|-
|Cimoliornis|
Owen
|
1846
|Nomen nudum
|
N/A
|
N/A
|
|-
|Coloborhynchus|
Owen
|
1874
| Valid
|

|
Europe
N. America
S. America
Africa
|
|-
|Comodactylus|
Galton
|
1981
|
Nomen dubium
|

|
N. America
|
|-
|Cretornis|
Fritsch
|
1880
|Valid
|

|
Europe
|
|-
|Criorhynchus|
Owen
|
1874
|
Jr. snyonym
|
N/A
|
N/A
|
Jr. synonym of Ornithocheirus.
|-
|Cryodrakon|Hone et al.|2019
|Valid
|
|N. America
|
|-
|Ctenochasma|
von Meyer
|
1852
| Valid
|
.
|
Europe
|
|-
|Cuspicephalus|
Martill
Etches
|
2013
|
Valid
|

|
Europe
|
|-
|Cycnorhamphus|
Seeley
|
1870
|
Valid
|
.
|
Europe
|
|-
|
"Daitingopterus"
|
Maisch
Matzke
Ge Sun
|
2004
| Nomen nudum
|

|
Europe
|
|-
|Daohugoupterus|Cheng et al.|2015
|Valid
|
|Asia
|
|-
|Darwinopterus|
Lü
Unwinet al.|
2009
| Valid
|

|
Asia
|
Intermediate form between rhamphorhynchoids and pterodactyloids.
|-
|Dawndraco|
Kellner
|
2010
|Valid
|

|
N. America
|
Possible junior synonym of Geosternbergia.
|-
|Dearc|Jagielska et al.
|2022
|Valid
|Middle Jurassic
|Isle of Skye
|
|-
|Dendrorhynchoides|
S.-A. Ji
Q. Ji
Padian
|
1999
| Valid
|
 or 
|
Asia
|
|-
|
"Dendrorhynchus"
|
S.-A. Ji
Q. Ji
|
1998
|
Preoccupied
|
N/A
|
N/A
|
Preoccupied name; now known as Dendrorhynchoides.
|-
|Dermodactylus|
Marsh
|
1881
| Nomen dubium
|

|
N. America
|
|-
|Dimorphodon|
Owen
|
1859
|
Valid
|

|
Europe
|
|-
|Diopecephalus|
Seeley
|
1871
|
Valid
|

|
Europe
|
|-
|Dolicorhamphus|
Seeley
|
1875
|Nomen dubium|

|
Europe
|
|-
|Domeykodactylus|
Martill
Freyet al.|
2000
| Valid
|

|
S. America
|
|-
|Doratorhynchus|
Seeley
|
1875
|Nomen vanum|
 or 
|
Europe
|
|-
|Dorygnathus|
Wagner
|
1860
| Valid
|

|
Europe
|
|-
|Douzhanopterus|
Wang et al.|
2017
| Valid
|

|
Asia
|
|-
|Draigwenia|Holgado
|2021
|Valid
|Early Cretaceous
|Europe
|
|-
|Dsungaripterus|
Young
|
1964
| Valid
|
-
|
Asia
|
|-
|Elanodactylus|
Andres
Ji, Q.
|
2008
| Valid
|

|
Asia
|
|-
|Eoazhdarcho|
Lü
Ji
|
2005
| Valid
|

|
Asia
|
|-
|Eopteranodon|
Lü
Zhang
|
2005
| Valid
|

|
Asia
|
|-
|Eosipterus|
Ji
Ji
|
1997
| Valid
|

|
Asia
|
|-
|Epapatelo| Fernandes et al.| 2022
| Valid
| 
| Africa
|
|-
|Eudimorphodon|
Zambelli
|
1973
|
Valid
|

|
Europe
|
|-
|Europejara|Vulloet al.|2012
|Valid
|
|Europe
|
|-
|Eurazhdarcho|Vremiret al.|2013
|Valid
|
|Europe
|
|-
|Eurolimnornis|Kessler
Jurcsák
|1986
|Valid
|
|Europe
|Originally described as a bird, subsequently reinterpreted as a pterosaur.
|-
|Faxinalipterus|
Bonaparte, et al.|
2010
|
Misidentification
|
N/A
|
N/A
|
Originally described as a pterosaur, but has since been reinterpreted as a non-pterosaur pterosauromorph.
|-
|Feilongus|
Wang, 
Kellner, et al.|
2005
| Valid
|

|
Asia
|
|-
|Fenghuangopterus|
Lü
Fucha
Chen
|
2010
| Valid
|

|
Asia
|
|-
|Ferrodraco|Pentland et al.|2019
|Valid
|
|Australia
|
|-
|Forfexopterus|Jiang et al.|2016
|Valid
|
|Asia
|
|-
|Gallodactylus|
Fabre
|
1974
| Jr. snyonym
| N/A
| N/A
| Jr. synonym of Cycnorhamphus.
|-
|Geosternbergia|
Miller
|
1978
|Valid
|N/A
|
N/A
|
Probable Jr. synonym of Pteranodon.
|-
|Gegepterus|
X. Wang
Kellneret al.|
2007
|
Valid
|

|
Asia
|
|-
|Germanodactylus|
Yang
|
1964
| Valid
|
.
|
Europe
|
|-
|Gladocephaloideus|
Lü
Ji
Wei
Liu
|
2011
| Valid
|

|
Asia
|
|-
|Gnathosaurus|
von Meyer
|
1833
| Valid
|

|
Europe
|
|-
|Guidraco|Wanget al.|2012
|Valid
|
|Asia
|
|-
|Gwawinapterus|
Arbour
Currie
|
2011
| Misidentification
|

|
N. America
|
Initially thought to be an istiodactylid pterosaur, but subsequently reinterpreted as an indeterminate saurodontid fish.
|-
|Hamipterus|Wanget al.|2014
|Valid
|
|Asia
|
|-
|Haopterus|
Wang X.
Lü
|
2001
| Valid
|

|
Asia
|
|-
|Harpactognathus|
Carpenter
Unwinet al.|
2003
| Valid
|

|
N. America
|
|-
|Hatzegopteryx|
Buffetaut
Grigorescu
Csiki
|
2002
| Valid
|

|
Europe
|
|-
|Herbstosaurus|
Casamiquela
|
1974
| Valid
|

|
S. America
|
|-
|Hongshanopterus|
X. Wang
Camposet al.|
2008
|
Valid
|

|
Asia
|
|-
|Huanhepterus|
Dong
|
1982
|
Valid
|

|
Asia
|
|-
|Huaxiadraco|
Pêgas et al.|
2023
|
Valid
|

|
Asia
|
|-
|Huaxiapterus|
Lü
C. Yuan
|
2005
|
Dubious
|

|
Asia
|
Possible junior synonym of Sinopterus.
|-
|Iberodactylus|Holgado et al.|2019
|Valid
|
|Europe
|
|-
|Ikrandraco|Wanget al.|2014
|Valid
|
|Asia
|
|-
|Ingridia|
Unwin
Martill
|
2007
|
Jr. snyonym
|
N/A
|
N/A
|
Objective Jr. synonym of Tupandactylus.
|-
|Istiodactylus|
Howse
Milner
Martill
|
2001
|
Valid
|

|
Europe
|
|-
|Javelinadactylus|
Campos
|
2021
|
Jr. synonym
|
N/A
|
N/A
|
Junior synonym of Wellnhopterus. Although named a few months earlier, its description was retracted over allegations that the describer did not have access to its holotype, and seemingly wrote it to beat out a major series of papers which the Wellnhopterus description was part of.
|-
|Jeholopterus|
X. Wang
Zhou
|
2002
|
Valid
|

or

|
Asia
|
|-
|Jianchangnathus|
Cheng
Wang
Jiang
Kellner
|
2012
|
Valid
|

|
Asia
|
|-
|Jianchangopterus|
Lü
Bo
|
2011
|
Valid
|

|
Asia
|
|-
|Jidapterus|
Dong
Sun
Wu
|
2003
|
Valid
|

|
Asia
|
|-
|Kariridraco|
Cerqueiraet al.|
2021
|
Valid
|

|
S. America
|
|-
|Kepodactylus|
Harris
Carpenter
|
1996
|
Valid
|

|
N. America
|
|-
|Keresdrakon|Kellner et al.|2019
|Valid
|
to

|S. America
|
|-
|Klobiodon|
O'Sullivan
Martill
|
2018
|
Valid
|

|
Europe
|
|-
|Kunpengopterus|
X. Wang
Kellneret al.|
2010
|
Valid
|

|
Asia
|
|-
|Kryptodrakon|Andres
Clark
Xu
|2014
|Valid
| and/or 
|Asia
|
|-
|Lacusovagus|
Witton
|
2008
|
Valid
|

|
S. America
|
|-
|Laopteryx|
Marsh
|
1881
|
Nomen dubium
|

|
N. America
|
|-
|Leptostomia|
Smith et al.|2020
|
Valid
|

or

|
Africa
|
|-
|Liaodactylus|
C.-F. Zhouet al.|
2017
|
Valid
|

|
Asia
|
|-
|Liaoningopterus|
X.-L. Wang
Z.-H. Zhou
|
2003
|
Valid
|

|
Asia
|
|-
|Liaoxipterus|
Dong
Lü
|
2005
|
Valid
|

|
Asia
|
|-
|Limnornis|Kessler
Jurcsák
|1984
|Preoccupied
|
|Europe
|Originally described as a bird; fossils later renamed Palaeolimnornis.
|-
|Linlongopterus|Rodrigues et al.|2015
|Valid
|
|Asia
|
|-
| Lingyuanopterus| Xu et al.|2022
|Valid
|
|Asia
|
|-
|
"Lithosteornis"
|
Gervais
|
1844
|Nomen nudum
|
N/A
|
N/A
|Nomen nudum.
|-
|Lonchodectes|
Hooley
|
1914
|
Valid
|

to

|
Europe
|
|-
|Lonchodraco|Rodrigues
Kellner
|2013
|Valid
|

to

|Europe
|
|-
|Lonchognathosaurus|
Maisch
Matzke
Ge Sun
|
2004
|
Valid
|

|
Asia
|
|-
|Longchengpterus|
L. Wang
L. Liet al.|
2006
|
Valid
|

|
Asia
|
|-
|Luchibang|
Hone
L. Liet al.|
2020
|
Valid
|

|
Asia
|
|-
|Ludodactylus|
Frey
Martill
Buchy
|
2003
| Valid
|

|
S. America
|
|-
|Luopterus|Hone
|2020
|Valid
|
|Asia
|
|-
|Maaradactylus|
Bantim et al.|
2014
|Valid
|

|
S. America
|
|-
|Macrotrachelus|
Giebel
|
1852
|
Jr. snyonym
|
N/A
|
N/A
|
Jr. synonym of Pterodactylus.
|-
|Mesadactylus|
Jensen
Padian
|
1989
|
Valid
|

|
N. America
|
|-
|Microtuban|
Elgin
Frey
|
2011
|
Valid
|

|
Africa
|
|-
|Mimodactylus|
Kellner et al.

|
2019
|
Valid
|

|
Lebanon
|
|-
|Mistralazhdarcho|
Vullo
Garcia

Godefroit et al.

|
2018
|
Valid
|

|
Europe
|
|-
|Moganopterus|Lüet al.|2012
|Valid
|
|Asia
|
|-
|Montanazhdarcho|
Padian
Horner
de Ricqlès
|
1993
|
Valid
|

|
N. America
|
|-
|Muzquizopteryx|
Frey
Buchyet al.|
2006
|
Valid
|

|
N. America
|
|-
|Mythunga|
Molnar
Thulborn
|
2008
|
Valid
|

|
Australia
|
|-
|Navajodactylus|
Sullivan
Fowler
|
2011
|
Valid
|

|
N. America
|
|-
|Nemicolopterus|
X. Wang
Kellner et al.|
2008
|
Valid
|

|
Asia
|
|-
|Nesodactylus|
Colbert
|
1969
|
Valid
|

|
Cuba
|
|-
|Nesodon|
Jensen
Ostrom
|
1977
|Lapsus calami|
N/A
|
N/A
|
Misspelling of Nesodactylus, also preoccupied by a toxodont.
|-
|Nicorhynchus|Holgado
Pêgas
|2020
|Valid
|

to

|Africa
Europe
|
|-
|Ningchengopterus|
Lü
|
2009
|
Valid
|

|
Asia
|
|-
|Noripterus|
Yang
|
1973
|
Valid
|

|
Asia
|
|-
|Normannognathus|
Buffetaut
J.-J. Lepage
G. Lepage
|
1998
|
Valid
|

|
Europe
|
|-
|Nurhachius|
Wang
Kellneret al.|
2003
|
Valid
|

|
Asia
|
|-
|Nyctodactylus|
Marsh
|
1881
|
Jr. snyonym
|
N/A
|
N/A
|
Jr. synonym of Nyctosaurus.
|-
|Nyctosaurus|
Marsh
|
1876
| Valid
|

|
N. America,
S. America
|
|-
|
"Odontorhynchus"
|
Stolley
|
1936
|
Jr. snyonym
|
N/A
|
N/A
|
Jr. synonym of Rhamphorhynchus.
|-
|
"Oolithorhynchus"
|
Whalley
|
2000
|Nomen nudum
|
|
|
Manuscript name about which almost nothing is known.
|-
|Orientognathus|Lü et al.|2015
|Valid
|
|Asia
|
|-
|Ordosipterus|
Ji
|
2020
|
Valid
|

|
Asia
|
|-
|Ornithocephalus|
von Sömmering
|
1812
|
Jr. snyonym
|
N/A
|
N/A
|
Jr. synonym of Pterodactylus.
|-
|Ornithocheirus|
Seeley
|
1869
| Valid
|
.
|
Europe
|
|-
|Ornithodesmus|
Seeley
|
1887
|
Misidentification
|
N/A
|
N/A
|
Misidentified dromaeosaurid.
|-
|Ornithopterus|
Fitzinger
|
1843
|
Jr. snyonym
|
N/A
|
N/A
|
Jr. synonym of Rhamphorhynchus.
|-
|Ornithostoma|
Seeley
|
1871
|
Valid
|

|
Europe
|
|-
|
"Osteornis"
|
Gervais
|
1844
|Nomen nudum
|
N/A
|
Europe
|Nomen ex dissertationae for pterosaur remains later named Palaeornis and Cimoliornis.
|-
|Otogopterus|Ji
Zhang
|2020
|Valid
|
|Asia
|
|-
|Pachagnathus|Martínezet al.|2022
|Valid
|
|S. America
|
|-
|Pachyrhamphus|
Fitzinger
|
1843
|
Preoccupied
|
N/A
|
N/A
|
Preoccupied name; now known as Scaphognathus|-
|Palaeocursornis|Kessler
Jurcsák
|1986
|Valid
|
|Europe
|Originally described under the name Limnornis as a bird; Limnornis was preoccupied, and the fossils were subsequently reinterpreted as pterosaurian.
|-
|Palaeornis|
Mantell
|
1844
|
Preoccupied
|
N/A
|
N/A
|
preoccupied name.
|-
|Pangupterus|Lü et al.|2016
|Valid
|
|Asia
|
|-
|Paranurognathus|
Peters
|
2005
|
Jr. snyonym
|
N/A
|
N/A
|
Jr. synonym of Anurognathus.
|-
|Parapsicephalus|
von Arthaber
|
1919
|
Valid
|

|
Europe
|
|-
|Peteinosaurus|
Wild
|
1978
| Valid
|

|
Europe
|
|-
|
"Phobetor"
|
Bakhurina
|
1986
|
Jr. snyonym
|
N/A
|
N/A
|
Jr. synonym of Noripterus.
|-
|Phosphatodraco|
Pereda-Suberbiola
Bardetet al.|
2003
|
Valid
|

|
Africa
|
|-
|Piksi|Varricchio
|2002
|Valid
|
|N. America
|Originally described as a bird, subsequently reinterpreted as a pterosaur.
|-
|Plataleorhynchus|
Howse
Milner
|
1995
|
Valid
|
 to 
|
Europe
|
|-
|Prejanopterus|
Vidarte
Calvo
|
2010
|
Valid
|

|
Europe
|
|-
|Preondactylus|
Wild
|
1983
|
Valid
|

|
Europe
|
|-
|
"Pricesaurus"
|
Bonaparte
Sanchez
|
1986
|Nomen nudum
|

|
S. America
|
|-
|Procoelosaurus|
Atanassov
|
2002
|Nomen ex dissertatione
|
|
|
|-
|Ptenodactylus|
Seeley
|
1869
|
Preoccupied
|
N/A
|
N/A
|
Preoccupied name.
|-
|Ptenodracon|
Lydekker
|
1888
|
Jr. synonym
|
N/A
|
N/A
|
Junior synonym of Ctenochasma.
|-
|Pteranodon|
Marsh
|
1876
|
Valid
|

|
N. America.
|
|-
|Ptéro-dactyle|
Cuvier
|
1809
|
|
N/A
|
N/A
|
Renamed Pterodactylus.
|-
|Pterodactylus|
Rafinesque
|
1815
| Valid
|
.
|
Africa,
Europe
|
|-
|Pterodaustro|
Bonaparte
|
1970
| Valid
|

|
S. America
|
|-
|Pterofiltrus|Jiang
Wang
|2011
|Valid
|
|Asia
|
|-
|Pteromimus|
Atanassov
|
2002
|Nomen ex dissertatione
|
|
|
|-
|Pteromonodactylus|
Teryaev
|
1967
|
Jr. snyonym
|
N/A
|
N/A
|
Jr. synonym of Rhamphorhynchus.
|-
|Pterorhynchus|
Czerkas
Q. Ji
|
2002
|
Valid
|

|
Asia
|
|-
|Pterotherium|
Fischer von Waldheim
|
1813
|
Jr. snyonym
|
N/A
|
N/A
|
Jr. synonym of Pterodactylus.
|-
|Puntanipterus|
Bonaparte
Sanchez
|
1975
| Valid
|

to

|
S. America
|
|-
|Qinglongopterus|
Lü
Unwinet al.|
2012
|
Valid
|

|
Asia
|
|-
|Quetzalcoatlus|
Lawson
|
1975
| Valid
|

|
N. America
|
|-
|Radiodactylus|Andres
Myers
|2013
|Valid
|
|N. America
|
|-
|Raeticodactylus|
Stecher
|
2008
|
Valid
|
N/A
|
N/A
|
Possible junior synonym of Caviramus|-
|Rhabdopelix|
Cope
|
1870
| Misidentification
| N/A
| N/A
| At first it was thought to be a Triassic pterosaur, but is now known to be (at least in part) a kuehneosaurid.
|-
|Rhamphinion|
Padian
|
1984
|
Valid
|

|
N. America
|
|-
|Rhamphocephalus|
Seeley
|
1880
|
Misidentification
|

|
Europe
|
Originally assigned to Pterosauria, later reassigned to Thalattosuchia.
|-
|Rhamphorhynchus|
von Meyer
|
1846
| Valid
|
.
|
Africa,
Europe
|
|-
|Samrukia| Naishet al.| 2012
| Valid
| 
| Asia
| Originally described as a bird but reinterpreted as a pterosaur.
|-
|Santanadactylus|
de Buisonjé
|
1980
| Valid
|

|
S. America
|
|-
|Scaphognathus|
Wagner
|
1861
| Valid
|
.
|
Europe
|
|-
|Seazzadactylus|Dalla Vecchia
|2019
|Valid
|
|Europe
|
|-
|Sericipterus|
Andres
Clark
X. Xing
|
2010
|
Valid
|

|
Asia
|
|-
|Serradraco|
Rigal
Martill
Sweetman
|
2017
| Valid
|
.
|
Europe
|
|-
|Shenzhoupterus|
Lü
Unwinet al.|
2008
| Valid
|

|
Asia
|
|-
|Simurghia|
Longrich et al.|
2018
| Valid
|

|
Africa
|
|-
|Sinomacrops|
Wei et al.|
2021
| Valid
|

to

|
Asia
|
|-
|Sinopterus|
X. Wang
Z. Zhou
|
2003
| Valid
|

|
Asia
|
|-
|Siroccopteryx|
Mader
Kellner
|
1999
|
Valid
|
N/A
|
N/A
|
Possible junior synonym of Coloborhynchus|-
|Sordes|
Sharov
|
1971
|
Valid
|
.
|
Asia
|
|-
|Sultanuvaisia|
Nesov
|
1981
|
Misidentification
|

|
Asia.
|
Actually a fish.
|-
|Tacuadactylus|
Soto et al.|
2021
|Valid
|

|
S. America
|
|-
|Tapejara|
Kellner
|
1989
| Valid
|

|
S. America
|
|-
|Targaryendraco|Pêgas et al.|2019
|Valid
|
|Europe
|
|-
|Tendaguripterus|
Unwin
Heinrich
|
1999
| Valid
|

|
Africa
|
|-
|Tethydraco|
Longrich et al.|
2018
| Valid
|

|
Africa
|
|-
|Thalassodromeus|
Kellner
Campos
|
2002
|
Valid
|

|
S. America
|
|-
|Thanatosdrakon|
Ortiz Davidet al.|
2022
| Valid
|

|
South America
|
|-
|Thapunngaka|
Richardset al.|
2021
|
Valid
|

|
Australia
|
|-
|
"Titanopteryx"
|
Arambourg
|
1959
| Preoccupied
|

|
Asia
| Preoccupied by a simuliid blackfly. It was later renamed Arambourgiania.
|-
|Tribelesodon|
Bassani
|
1886
|
Misidentification
|
N/A
|
N/A
|
At first it was thought to be a Triassic pterosaur but is now known to be a misinterpreted specimen of the prolacertiform Tanystropheus.
|-
|Tropeognathus|
Wellnhofer
|
1987
|
Valid
|

|
S. America
|
One of the largest anhanguerids.
|-
|Tupandactylus|
Kellner
Campos
|
2007
|
Valid
|

|
S. America
|
|-
|Tupuxuara|
Kellner
Campos
|
1988
|
Valid
|

|
S. America
|
|-
|Uktenadactylus|
Rodrigues
Kellner
|
2008
|
Valid
|

|
N. America
|
Possible junior synonym of Coloborhynchus|-
|Unwindia|
Martill
|
2011
|
Valid
|

|
S. America
|
|-
|Utahdactylus|
Czerkas
Mickelson
|
2002
|
Valid
|

|
N. America
|
|-
|Vectidraco|Naish
Simpson
Dyke
|2013
|Valid
|
|Europe
|
|-
|Vesperopterylus|
Lüet al.|
2017
|
Valid
|

|
Asia
|
|-
|Volgadraco|
Averianov
Arkhangelsky
Pervushov
|
2008
| Valid
|

|
Asia
|
|-
|Wellnhopterus|Andres,Langston Jr.
|2021
|Valid
|Late Cretaceous
|N. America
|
|-
|Wenupteryx|Codorniú
Gasparini
|2013
|Valid
|
|S. America
|
|-
|Wightia|Martill et al.|2020
|Valid
|
|Europe
|
|-
|Wukongopterus|
X. Wang
Kellneret al.|
2009
|
Valid
|

|
Asia
|
|-
|
"Wyomingopteryx"
|
Bakker
|
1994
| Nomen nudum
|
|
|
|-
|Xericeps|
D. Martillet al.|
2017
|
Valid
|

to

|
Africa
|
|-
|Yelaphomte|Martínezet al.|2022
|Valid
|
|S. America
|
|-
|Yixianopterus|
Lü
S. Jiet al.|
2006
|
Valid
|

|
Asia
|
|-
|Zhejiangopterus|
Z. Cai
F. Wei
|
1994
|
Valid
|

|
Asia
|
|-
|Zhenyuanopterus|
Lü
|
2010
|
Valid
|

|
Asia
|
|-
|}
|style="border:0px" valign="top"|
|style="border:0px" valign="top"|

|-
|}

 Ichnogenera 

 Oogenera 
Although pterosaur eggs are known, some with complete embryos, no oogenera have been erected to house them. The holotype of the oospecies Oolithes sphaericus'' was briefly considered by Harry Govier Seeley to be pterosaurian in origin, although this attribution was dismissed before the formal erection of that oogenus.

See also 

 List of dinosaurs
 List of plesiosaurs
 List of pterosaur classifications
 Pterosaur
 Timeline of pterosaur research

References

External links 

 Pterosaur FAQs, by Raymond Thaddeus C. Ancog.
 The Pterosaur Database, by Paul Pursglove.

Pterosaurs
Pterosaurs